Walshia albicornella is a moth in the family Cosmopterigidae. It was described by August Busck in 1914. It is found in Panama.

References

Moths described in 1914
Chrysopeleiinae